Typhonium angustilobum is a species of plant in the arum family that is native to Australia and New Guinea.

Description
The species is a deciduous geophytic, perennial herb, which resprouts annually from a corm 4–10 cm in diameter. The narrowly trilobate leaves are borne on stalks up to 35 cm long. The flower is enclosed in a 22 cm long spathe, greenish on the outside, brownish-purple on the inside.

Distribution and habitat
The species is known from northern Queensland as well as the Western Province of Papua New Guinea, where it grows in open woodland.

References

 
angustilobum
Monocots of Australia
Flora of Queensland
Flora of Papua New Guinea
Taxa named by Ferdinand von Mueller
Plants described in 1876